Dheran Young is an Australian Labor politician who currently serves as MLA for Daly in the Northern Territory Legislative Assembly, having won a by-election in September 2021.

Political career
After the announcement of the 2021 Daly by-election, following the resignation of the sitting member, Young was declared as the Labor Party candidate for the seat. Before standing in the by-election, Young had served as an advisor to both chief minister Michael Gunner and attorney-general Selena Uibo. After the announcement of Young's candidacy, it was reported that he had allegedly sworn at and threatened Country Liberal MLA Joshua Burgoyne in February 2021. On 23 February 2021, Young apologised for his actions towards Burgoyne, although he denied using swear words.

Young won the by-election, becoming the first government candidate in Northern Territory electoral history to win a seat at a by-election previously held by the opposition.

References

Living people
Members of the Northern Territory Legislative Assembly
Australian Labor Party members of the Northern Territory Legislative Assembly
Indigenous Australian politicians
21st-century Australian politicians
Year of birth missing (living people)
Place of birth missing (living people)